Little Eagle Cone is a subglacial mound in northwestern British Columbia, Canada, located in the Dark Mountain area. It last erupted during the Pleistocene epoch.

See also
List of volcanoes in Canada
List of Northern Cordilleran volcanoes
Volcanism of Canada
Volcanism of Western Canada

References

Volcanoes of British Columbia
One-thousanders of British Columbia
Subglacial mounds of Canada
Pleistocene volcanoes
Monogenetic volcanoes
Northern Cordilleran Volcanic Province
Cassiar Country